Karina Krause (born 11 February 1989) is a Thai indoor volleyball player. She is a member of the Thailand women's national volleyball team.

Awards

Individuals
 2016 Thai-Denmark Super League "Best Server"

Clubs
 2011 Princess's Cup -  Runner-Up, with PEA Club
 2011–12 Thailand League -  Champion, with Nakornnonthaburi
 2012 Princess's Cup -  Champion, with PEA Club
 2012–13 Thailand League -  Runner-Up, with Nakornnonthaburi
 2013 Princess's Cup -  Champion, with PEA Sisaket
 2014 Pro Challenge -  Champion, with Bangkok Glass
 2014–2015 Thailand League -  Champion, with Bangkok Glass
 2015 Thai–Denmark Super League -  Champion, with Bangkok Glass
 2015 Asian Club Championship -  Champion, with Bangkok Glass
 2015–2016 Thailand League -  Champion, with Bangkok Glass
 2016 Thai–Denmark Super League -  Champion, with Bangkok Glass
 2016 Sealect Tuna Championship -  Runner-Up, with Bangkok Glass
 2016 Asian Club Championship -  Bronze medal, with Bangkok Glass
 2016–17 Thailand League -  Runner-up, with Bangkok Glass
 2017 Thai–Denmark Super League -  Runner-up, with Bangkok Glass
 2017–18 Thailand League -  Third, with Bangkok Glass
 2018 Thai–Denmark Super League -  Runner-up, with Bangkok Glass
 2019 Thai–Denmark Super League -  Third, with Khonkaen Star

References

External links
 FIVB Biography

1989 births
Living people
Karina Krause
Karina Krause
Karina Krause
Karina Krause
Karina Krause